Loxophlebia klagesi is a moth of the subfamily Arctiinae. It was described by Rothschild in 1911. It is found in Trinidad, Venezuela and Suriname.

References

 Natural History Museum Lepidoptera generic names catalog

Loxophlebia
Moths described in 1911